Lyric Opera is an opera company in Chicago. Other companies or opera houses with that name include:

Asheville Lyric Opera, North Carolina
Austin Lyric Opera, Texas, former name of Austin Opera
Lyric Opera Baltimore, Maryland
Lyric Opera House, former name of the Modell Performing Arts Center in Baltimore
Baltimore Lyric Opera, former name of the Baltimore Opera Company
Boston Lyric Opera, Massachusetts
Lyric Opera Cleveland, merged with Opera Cleveland (2007–2010)
Connecticut Lyric Opera, New London
Lyric Opera of Kansas City, Missouri
Lyric Opera of Los Angeles
Philadelphia Lyric Opera Company, Pennsylvania (1958–1974)
Lyric Opera of San Antonio, Texas, former name of San Antonio Opera
Lyric Opera San Diego, California
Lyric Opera of Virginia (defunct since 2017)
Lyric Opera of Queensland, former name of Opera Queensland, Australia

See also
Lyric Theatre (disambiguation)

Opera houses
Opera companies